Nallathambi is a Tamil male given name. could refer to any of the following:

Film
 Nallathambi (1949 film) 
 Nalla Thambi 1985 film

People
 A. Nallathambi (AIADMK politician) Indian politician and MLA from Gangavalli, Tamil Nadu
 A. Nallathambi (DMK politician) Indian politician and MLA from Tirupattur, Tamil Nadu
 K. Nalla Thambi Indian politician and MLA from  Egmore, Tamil Nadu
 M. Nallathambi Sri Lankan Tamil poet, scholar and teacher.
 Kanthar Nallathamby Srikantha Sri Lankan Tamil lawyer, politician
 Pammal Nallathambi Indian politician and MLA from  Tambaram, Tamil Nadu
 Ramani Nallathambi Indian politician and MLA from Radhapuram, Tamil Nadu
 Vallipuram Nallathamby Navaratnam  Sri Lankan Tamil lawyer, politician

Tamil masculine given names